Otto Furrer (19 October 1903 – 26 July 1951) was a Swiss alpine skier and cross-country skier and world champion.

Furrer was born in Zermatt. He became a world champion in the combined event, received a silver medal in the slalom and a bronze medal in the downhill in Cortina d'Ampezzo in 1932. He was killed in an accident on the Matterhorn.

References

1903 births
1951 deaths
Swiss male alpine skiers
Swiss male cross-country skiers
Swiss military patrol (sport) runners
Olympic cross-country skiers of Switzerland
Cross-country skiers at the 1928 Winter Olympics
Military patrol competitors at the 1928 Winter Olympics
Olympic biathletes of Switzerland
People from Zermatt
Accidental deaths in Switzerland
Sportspeople from Valais